The Taftan Rifles is a paramilitary regiment forming part of the Frontier Corps Balochistan (South) of Pakistan. It is named after the border town of Taftan, Balochistan. The regiment is tasked with defending part of the border with Afghanistan and Iran, and assisting with law enforcement in the districts adjacent to the border. This includes countering drug smuggling operations from the Golden Crescent, with several significant seizures such as in May 2019, October 2019, and May 2021.

The Rifles have undergone an expansion in recent years with more than 1,700 recruits being successfully trained over a two-year period covering 2021 and 2022.

Units
 Headquarters Wing
 73 Wing
 75 Wing
 105 Wing
 109 Wing
 148 Wing
 167 Wing
 170 Wing

References

Regiments of the Frontier Corps
Frontier Corps Balochistan (South)